António Manuel Tavares "Tony" Fonseca (born 30 January 1965) is a Portuguese former footballer who played as a left back, and a technical director for the Canadian Soccer Association.

Over 11 seasons, he amassed Primeira Liga totals of 199 games and two goals, representing in the competition Benfica, Vitória de Guimarães and Estrela da Amadora. He finished his career in Canada, where he started working as a manager in 1999.

Club career
Born in Lisbon, Fonseca played youth football for five clubs, finishing his grooming at local S.L. Benfica. From 1983 to 1987 he competed in the Segunda Liga, after which the former bought him from F.C. Tirsense.

During his three-year tenure with Benfica, Fonseca was first-choice in the 1988–89 campaign as the team won the Primeira Liga championship and also reached the final of the Taça de Portugal, but played second-fiddle to Álvaro Magalhães and Samuel Quina in the other two. In eight of the following nine seasons he continued to play in the top flight, with Vitória S.C. and C.F. Estrela da Amadora, appearing regularly for both sides and reuniting at the latter with former Benfica teammates Edmundo, José Carlos, Fernando Mendes and Paulinho.

Fonseca retired from football in 2000 at the age of 35, after two years with the Vancouver Whitecaps FC in the USL A-League, with whom he later worked as a manager.

International career
Fonseca earned four caps for Portugal, over one year. He made his debut on 29 March 1989, playing the entirety of a 6–0 friendly win over Angola with marked the 75th anniversary of the Portuguese Football Federation.

During five years, Fonseca served as assistant to Stephen Hart and Dale Mitchell at the Canadian national team, while also being in charge of the under-23s. Already as a technical director for the Canadian Soccer Association, he acted as interim for the full side following the departure of Colin Miller, who later replaced him after two friendlies.

Personal life
Fonseca married a Portuguese-Canadian woman, fathering two children.

References

Bibliography

External links

1965 births
Living people
Footballers from Lisbon
Portuguese footballers
Association football defenders
Primeira Liga players
Liga Portugal 2 players
C.D. Cova da Piedade players
G.C. Alcobaça players
F.C. Tirsense players
S.L. Benfica footballers
Vitória S.C. players
C.F. Estrela da Amadora players
A-League (1995–2004) players
Vancouver Whitecaps (1986–2010) players
Portugal youth international footballers
Portugal international footballers
Portuguese expatriate footballers
Expatriate soccer players in Canada
Portuguese expatriate sportspeople in Canada
Portuguese football managers
Canada men's national soccer team managers
Expatriate soccer managers in Canada